The East Branch Sacandaga River originates at the outflow of Botheration Pond (GPS 43.682067, -74.095207) in Johnsburg, NY. It flows into the Middle Branch of the Sacandaga River at GPS (43.446084, -74.250853) in Wells, New York. The East Branch Gorge Path is an unmarked trail that extends about a mile and climbs 115 feet along the East Branch Sacandaga River.

References 

Rivers of New York (state)
Tributaries of the Sacandaga River